This is the discography of American rock band Survivor.

Albums

Studio albums

Live albums

Compilation albums

Video albums

Singles

References

Discographies of American artists
Rock music group discographies